Barthe is a surname. Notable people with the surname include:

Alexandre Barthe (born 1986), French footballer
Benjamin Barthe (born 1972), French journalist
Earl Barthé (1932-2010), American plasterer and plastering historian
Eugène Barthe (1862–1945), French entomologist
Georges-Isidore Barthe (1834–1900), Canadian lawyer and political figure, brother of Joseph-Guillaume
Joseph-Guillaume Barthe (1818–1893), Canadian lawyer and political figure, brother of Georges-Isidore
Obdulio Barthe (1903-1981), Paraguayan trade unionist and political activist
Richmond Barthé (1901–1989), American sculptor
Sam Barthe

See also
Angéle de la Barthe (1210–1275), French woman accused of witchcraft

Occitan-language surnames